Zdzisław Kwaśny (born November 6, 1960) is a retired hammer thrower from Poland, who is best known for winning the bronze medal in the men's hammer throw event at the inaugural 1983 World Championships. He set his personal best (80.18 m) in the same event on 1983-08-21 at a meet in London, United Kingdom.

Achievements

References

1960 births
Living people
Polish male hammer throwers
Place of birth missing (living people)
World Athletics Championships medalists